M21 or M-21 may refer to:

Transportation
 M21 (New York City bus), a New York City Bus route in Manhattan
 M-21 highway (Michigan), a road connecting Flint and Grand Rapids
 M21 (East London), a Metropolitan Route in East London, South Africa
 M21 (Pretoria), a Metropolitan Route in Pretoria, South Africa
 M21 (Durban), a Metropolitan Route in Durban, South Africa
 Highway M21 (Ukraine)

Military
 HMS M21, Royal Navy M15 class monitor; sunk in 1918
 M21 mine, an American circular anti-tank landmine
 M21 Sniper Weapon System, a sniper rifle based on the M14 rifle
 Zastava M21, a Serbian assault rifle
 the carrier aircraft for the Lockheed D-21
 M21 Mortar Motor Carriage, a Half-Track carrying an 81mm Mortar

Other
 BMW M21, a 1983 2.4 L diesel straight-6 engine
 MSrE M-21, Hungarian aerobatics aircraft
 Lockheed M-21, an American reconnaissance drone carrier aircraft
 MacGregor 21, an American sailboat design
 Messier 21, an open star cluster in the constellation Sagittarius
 Proton Putra, car model sold in Australia as Proton M21
 M postcode area, M21 Chorlton-cum-Hardy, Firswood area of Manchester